Yell Htwe Aung (also spelt Ye Htwe Aung; 7 April 1993 – 2 January 2018) was a Burmese internet comedian and actor who had posted dozens of sit-com style videos to Facebook and YouTube. He made his acting debut in the film Ko Saunt Nat (My Guardian Angel).

Early life and career
Yell Htwe Aung was born on 7 April 1993, in Yangon to Burmese Muslim parents. His father was a Gujarati Muslim from the state of Gujarat on the Northwestern coast of India, and his mother was Burmese Muslim. He started his career with comedy videos, acting with Kelvin Kate. Rising to fame in 2015, he became a professional actor. The first film in which he starred was Ko Saunt Nat, which was directed by Win Lwin Htet and written and produced by Hlwan Paing. In 2017, he starred in a big-screen film Diary, as the lead role, alongside actress May Myat Noe. The film was directed by Joe.

Death
On New Year's Eve 2017, Aung was attending a party at The One Entertainment Park in Thingangyun Township, he was attacked by a group of men. He was brought to the nearest hospital, but died there on 2 January 2018 from his injuries.

Aftermath

Trial and release of suspects
Three primary suspects — Than Htut Aung, Pyae Phyo Aung and Kyaw Zaw Han — surrendered to police soon after the incident. They were released on 25 July 2018 after the Yangon Eastern District Court accepted an appeal from Yell Htwe Aung's family asking to settle the case. According to court documents, Yangon Region Attorney General approved the request from his family to drop the case, citing a lack of evidence implicating the accused.

Public criticism and subsequent investigations
The release of murder suspects without any charges being filed raised public criticism, and prompted calls by lawmakers, activists and lawyers to investigate officials involved in the decision to drop the case. On 30 July 2018, President Win Myint ordered an investigation, and Attorney General of Myanmar ordered Yangon Region Attorney General to reopen the case at the Yangon Region Court. The Yangon Region Court summoned the three suspects on 1 August 2018.

On 3 August 2018, the Anti-Corruption Commission of Myanmar agreed to look into the case whether there was sufficient evidence involving violations of the Anti-Corruption Law. On 13 September 2018, the Anti-Corruption Commission filed a lawsuit against the Yangon Region Attorney-General Han Htoo, a district judge, three other government attorneys and a police officer for taking bribes worth more than K 70 million (US$46,300) to drop the case.

Filmography

Film (Cinema)
Ko Saunt Nat (2018)
Diary (2018)
Tin String (2019)

References

External links

1993 births
2018 deaths
Burmese comedians
Burmese Muslims
Burmese people of Gujarati descent
People from Yangon
Burmese male models
Burmese male film actors
Violent deaths in Myanmar
2018 murders in Myanmar
Unsolved murders in Myanmar